ZEB2-AS1 (ZEB2 antisense RNA 1) is a long non-coding RNA, which is overlapping and antisense to the ZEB2 gene. It overlaps the 5′ splice site of an intron within the 5′UTR of the ZEB2 gene. This intron contains an internal ribosome entry site (IRES), which is necessary for ZEB2 expression. ZEB2-AS1 prevents the splicing of this intron, and therefore activates ZEB2 expression.

See also
 Long noncoding RNA

References

Further reading

External links
 
 
 
 

Non-coding RNA